Thrixopelma pruriens, known as the Peruvian green velvet tarantula, is a species of tarantula found in Chile in South America (not Peru).

Though docile, this species is rarely kept as a pet in part due to its tendency to fling urticating hairs with minimal provocation.

In 2014, researchers at Yale University identified a toxin called Protoxin-I from the tarantula's venom that shows promise as a new painkiller drug.  The toxin reduces activity in an ion channel associated with inflammation and neuropathic pain, making it potentially suitable as a treatment for both normal pain and pathological pain syndromes.

References

Theraphosidae
Spiders of South America
Spiders described in 1998